Events in 1975 in Japanese television.

Debuts

Ongoing
Music Fair, music (1964-present)
Mito Kōmon, jidaigeki (1969-2011)
Sazae-san, anime (1969-present)
Ōedo Sōsamō, jidaigeki (1970-1984)
Ōoka Echizen, jidaigeki (1970-1999)
Star Tanjō!, talent (1971-1983)
First Human Giatrus, anime (1974-1976)
Ganbare!! Robocon, tokusatsu (1974-1977)
FNS Music Festival, music (1974-present)

Endings

See also
1975 in anime
1975 in Japan
List of Japanese films of 1975

References